Teo Chee Kang is a Malaysian politician from Liberal Democratic Party. He was the President of LDP from 2014 to 2018 and the Member of Sabah State Legislative Assembly for Tanjong Kapor from 2008 to 2018.

Election results

Honours 
  :
  Commander of the Order of Meritorious Service (PJN) — Datuk (2010) 
  :
  Grand Commander of the Order of Kinabalu (SPDK) - Datuk Seri Panglima (2017)

External links

References 

21st-century Malaysian politicians
Place of birth missing (living people)
Presidents of Liberal Democratic Party (Malaysia)
Members of the Sabah State Legislative Assembly
Malaysian people of Chinese descent
Malaysian politicians of Chinese descent
Living people
Year of birth missing (living people)
Commanders of the Order of Meritorious Service
Grand Commanders of the Order of Kinabalu